Admiral Noble may refer to:

Albert G. Noble (1895–1980), U.S. Navy admiral (promoted from vice admiral upon retirement)
Joseph D. Noble (born 1967), U.S. Navy rear admiral
Percy Noble (Royal Navy officer) (1880–1955), British Royal Navy admiral